New Corella, officially the Municipality of New Corella, is a 2nd class municipality in the province of Davao del Norte, Philippines. According to the 2020 census, it has a population of 57,913 people.

Geography

Climate

Barangays
New Corella is politically subdivided into 20 barangays.

Demographics

Economy

References

External links
 New Corella Profile at the DTI Cities and Municipalities Competitive Index
 [ Philippine Standard Geographic Code]
 Philippine Census Information
 Local Governance Performance Management System

Municipalities of Davao del Norte